Trigger finger, also known as stenosing tenosynovitis, is  a disorder characterized by catching or locking of the involved finger in full or near full flexion, typically with force. There may be tenderness in the palm of the hand near the last skin crease (distal palmar crease). The name "trigger finger" may refer to the motion of "catching" like a trigger on a gun. The ring finger and thumb are most commonly affected.

The problem is generally idiopathic (no known cause). There may be an association with diabetes. The pathophysiology is enlargement of the flexor tendon and the A1 pulley of the tendon sheath.  While often referred to as a type of stenosing tenosynovitis (which implies inflammation) the pathology is mucoid degeneration. Mucoid degeneration is when fibrous tissue such as tendon has less organized collagen, more abundant extra-cellular matrix, and changes in the cells (fibrocytes) to act and look more like cartilage cells (chondroid metaplasia). Diagnosis is typically based on symptoms and signs after excluding other possible causes.

Trigger digits can resolve without treatment. Treatment options that are disease modifying include steroid injections and surgery. Splinting immobilization of the finger may or may not be disease modifying.

Signs and symptoms
Symptoms include catching or locking of the involved finger when it is forcefully flexed. There may be tenderness in the palm of the hand near the last skin crease (distal palmar crease). Often a nodule can be felt in this area. There is some evidence that idiopathic trigger finger behaves differently in people with diabetes.

Causes
It is important to distinguish association and causation. The vast majority of trigger digits are idiopathic, meaning there is no known cause. However, recent publications indicate that diabetes and high blood sugar levels increases the risk of developing trigger finger.

Some speculate that repetitive forceful use of a digit leads to narrowing of the fibrous digital sheath in which it runs, but there is little scientific data to support this theory. The relationship of trigger finger to work activities is debatable and there are arguments for and against a relationship to hand use with no experimental evidence supporting a relationship.

Diagnosis

Diagnosis is made on interview and physical examination. More than one finger may be affected at a time. It is most common in the thumb and ring finger. The triggering more often occurs while gripping an object firmly or during sleep when the palm of the subject’s hand remains closed for an extended period of time. Upon waking, the affected person may have to force the triggered fingers open with their other hand. In some, this can be a daily occurrence.

Treatment

Depending on the number of affected digits and the clinical severity of the condition, Corticosteroid injections can cure trigger digits.

Treatment consists of injection of a corticosteroid such as methylprednisolone often combined with a local anesthetic (lidocaine) at the A1 pulley in the palm. The infiltration of the affected site is straightforward using standard anatomic landmarks. There is evidence that the steroid does not need to enter the sheath. The role of sonographic guidance is therefore debatable.

Injection of the tendon sheath with a corticosteroid is effective over weeks to months in more than half of people. Steroid injection is not effective in people with Type 1 diabetes. If triggering persists 2 months after injection, a second injection can be considered.  Most specialists recommend no more than 3 injections because corticosteroids can weaken the tendon and there is a possibility of tendon rupture. 

Triggering is predictably resolved by a relatively simple surgical procedure under local anesthesia. The surgeon will cut the sheath that is restricting the tendon. The patient should be awake in order to confirm adequate release. On occasion, triggering does not resolve until a slip of the FDS (Flexor digitorum superficialis) tendon is resected. 

One study suggests that the most cost-effective treatment is up to two corticosteroid injections followed by open release of the first annular pulley. Choosing surgery immediately is an option and can be affordable if done in the office under local anesthesia.

Surgery
Trigger digits can be released percutaneously using a needle. This is not used for the thumb where the digital reves are at greater risk.

Postoperative outcome
In some trigger finger patients, tenderness is found in the dorsal proximal interphalangeal (PIP) joint. Dorsal PIP joint tenderness is more common in trigger fingers than previously thought. It is also associated with higher and prolonged levels of postoperative pain after A1 pulley release. Therefore, patients with pre-existing PIP tenderness should be informed about the possibility of sustaining residual minor pain for up to 3 months after surgery.

References

External links 

 Video of Trigger Finger Release Surgery on YouTube
 American Academy of Orthopaedic Surgeons information on trigger finger
 Information from the Mayo Clinic

Ailments of unknown cause
Fingers
Inflammations
Disorders of synovium and tendon
Wikipedia medicine articles ready to translate